Johann Sebastian Bach composed the church cantata  (Take away from us, Lord, faithful God), 101 in Leipzig for the tenth Sunday after Trinity and first performed it on 13 August 1724. The chorale cantata is based on the hymn by Martin Moller (1584).

History and words 

Bach composed the cantata in Leipzig for the Tenth Sunday after Trinity as part of his second cantata cycle. The prescribed readings for the Sunday were from the First Epistle to the Corinthians, different gifts, but one spirit, and from the Gospel of Luke, Jesus announcing the destruction of Jerusalem and cleansing of the Temple.

The text of the cantata is based on the seven stanzas of Martin Moller's chorale (1584), which he had written during a time of plague, as a paraphrase of the Latin poem "" (1541). The chorale is sung on the melody of Martin Luther's "" on the Lord's Prayer. The words are used unchanged in the outer movement. An unknown poet transcribed the ideas of stanzas 2, 4 and 6 to arias. He retained the text of stanzas 3 and 5, but interpolated it by recitative. The cantata text is only generally related to the readings, unlike , a year before, dealing with the lament of Jerusalem in text from Lamentations. But the poet hinted at the destruction of Jerusalem by "" (so that, through sinful acts, we might not be destroyed like Jerusalem!) in movement 2.

Bach first performed the cantata on 13 August 1724.

Scoring and structure 
The cantata in seven movements is richly scored for four vocal soloists (soprano, alto, tenor, and bass), a four-part choir, cornett, three trombones, two oboes, taille (tenor oboe), flauto traverso  (or violin), two violins, viola and basso continuo.

 Chorus: 
 Aria (tenor): 
 Recitative and chorale (soprano): 
 Aria (bass): 
 Recitative and chorale (tenor): 
 Aria (soprano, alto): 
 Chorale:

Music 
The chorale melody in Dorian mode is present in all movements but the first aria. The opening chorus is a chorale fantasia with the cantus firmus in the soprano, each line prepared by the lower voices. A choir of trombones plays colla parte with the voices, embedded in a setting of oboes and strings, which is also rather vocal. John Eliot Gardiner notes Bach's "disturbing intensification of harmony and vocal expression for the words '' (contagion, fire and grievous pain) at the end of the movement".

The first aria is accompanied by a virtuoso flute, replaced by a violin in a later version. The recitative combines an embellished version of the chorale melody with secco recitative. The central movement starts like a dramatic aria, marked vivace, in three oboes and continuo. But after this "furious ritornello" the bass begins unexpectedly, marked andante, with the first line of the chorale stanza on the chorale melody, raising the question "why are you so incensed with us". In the middle section, the complete chorale is played by the instruments, while the voice sings independently.

The second recitative is symmetric to the first. Movement 6 combines two voices, the flute and the oboe da caccia, which plays the chorale melody. The instrumentation is similar to the central movement of Bach's St Matthew Passion, . The final stanza is set for four parts.

Recordings 
 Die Bach Kantate Vol. 47, Helmuth Rilling, Gächinger Kantorei, Bach-Collegium Stuttgart, Arleen Augér, Helen Watts, Aldo Baldin, John Bröcheler, Hänssler 1979
 J. S. Bach: Das Kantatenwerk – Sacred Cantatas Vol. 6, Nikolaus Harnoncourt, Tölzer Knabenchor, Concentus Musicus Wien, soloist of the Tölzer Knabenchor, Paul Esswood, Kurt Equiluz, Philippe Huttenlocher, Teldec 1980
 J. S. Bach: Complete Cantatas Vol. 10, Ton Koopman, Amsterdam Baroque Orchestra & Choir, Caroline Stam, Michael Chance, Paul Agnew, Klaus Mertens, Antoine Marchand 1998
 Bach Edition Vol. 20 – Cantatas Vol. 11, conductor Pieter Jan Leusink, Holland Boys Choir, Netherlands Bach Collegium, Marjon Strijk, Sytse Buwalda, Nico van der Meel, Bas Ramselaar, Brilliant Classics 2000
 Bach Cantatas Vol. 5: Rendsburg/Braunschweig, John Eliot Gardiner, Monteverdi Choir, English Baroque Soloists, Joanne Lunn, Daniel Taylor, Christoph Genz, Gotthold Schwarz, Soli Deo Gloria 2000
 J. S. Bach: Cantatas Vol. 31 – Cantatas from Leipzig 1724, Masaaki Suzuki, Bach Collegium Japan, Yukari Nonoshita, Robin Blaze, Gerd Türk, Peter Kooy, BIS 2004

References

Sources 
 
 Nimm von uns, Herr, du treuer Gott BWV 101; BC A 118 / Chorale cantata (10th Sunday after Trinity) Bach Digital
 Cantata BWV 101 Nimm von uns, Herr, du treuer Gott history, scoring, sources for text and music, translations to various languages, discography, discussion, Bach Cantatas Website
 BWV 101 Nimm von uns, Herr, du treuer Gott English translation, University of Vermont
 BWV 101 Nimm von uns, Herr, du treuer Gott text, scoring, University of Alberta
 Luke Dahn: BWV 101.7 bach-chorales.com

Church cantatas by Johann Sebastian Bach
1724 compositions
Chorale cantatas